Meeting in the Night is a 1946 Swedish film directed by Hasse Ekman. The film stars Ekman, Eva Dahlbeck and Ulf Palme.

Plot summary
The journalist Åke Bergström writes a critical article about prisons in Sweden. The magazine's editor in chief disagrees with him and removes the article. He also fires Åke, who gets the idea that he should pretend to murder a friend to gain real knowledge about life inside the walls of a prison. What sounds like a clever but mad idea at first, soon turns out to be a real nightmare...

Cast
Hasse Ekman - Åke Bergström
Eva Dahlbeck - Marit Rylander
Ulf Palme - Sune Berger
Tord Bernheim - Svarten
Peter Lindgren - Filarn
Hugo Björne - direktör Rylander
Elsa Widborg - Argonda
Eivor Landström - Sonja
Karin Alexandersson - Lovisa
Sigge Fürst - Spacklarn
Gösta Cederlund - Holmstedt, editor in chief 
Carl Reinholdz - Lången
Wiktor "Kulörten" Andersson - Darris
Josua Bengtson - Eskil
Charlie Almlöf - Carnival Barker at Gröna Lund
Artur Rolén - Karlsson
Tord Stål - Karl-Axel, Second Editor 
Åke Engfeldt - Telegraph Worker 
Arne Lindblad - Maitre d' at Saltsjöholm's hotel 
Sten Hedlund - Detective

External links

1946 films
Films directed by Hasse Ekman
1940s Swedish-language films
Swedish crime films
1946 crime films
Swedish black-and-white films
1940s Swedish films